Lake Okahumpka is a freshwater lake in Wildwood, Florida, United States. Lake Okahumpka Park is along part of its shoreline. In 1980, the United States Geological Survey reported on the hydrology of Lake Okahumpka and Lake Deaton area.

The lake is east of Wildwood on the south side of State Road 44. The lake has been treated for hydrilla. Ring neck ducks have been hunted from its shores.

See also
Okahumpka, Florida

References

Bodies of water of Sumter County, Florida
Okahumpka